Seifu Retta (born 29 December 1954) is an Ethiopian boxer. He competed in the men's light middleweight event at the 1980 Summer Olympics. At the 1980 Summer Olympics, he lost to George Kabuto of Uganda.

References

1954 births
Living people
Ethiopian male boxers
Olympic boxers of Ethiopia
Boxers at the 1980 Summer Olympics
Place of birth missing (living people)
Light-middleweight boxers